Soldaditos de Pavía (lit. Soldiers of Pavia) are a dish  of fried cod wrapped in a slice of roasted red pepper. The dish is found in Andalusian cuisine and common at tapas bars in Madrid, capital of Spain. The cod is marinated in a paprika and lemon juice mix. Before being fried, the pieces of cod can be placed in cold seasoned water and removed when the water begins to boil. It's said to be a popular dish after Easter in the 1905 cookbook by Manuel Maria Puga y Parga.

The name of the dish may be taken from the orange-red uniforms of the Hussars in reference to the similarity with the red pepper.

References

Tapas
Spanish cuisine
Andalusian cuisine
Culture in Madrid
Fish dishes
Fried foods